Ponciano Elofre (sometimes spelled Ponciano Elopre), later called  (Hiligaynon for "Tornado/Whirlwind God"), was a  (head) of a  in Zamboanguita in Negros Oriental, Philippines, and the leader of a politico-religious revolt on Negros in the late 19th century against the Spaniards.

Revolutionary activities
Spanish soldiers beat his father, Cris Elofre, to death in order to teach him a lesson. Thereafter, he rallied the people against the forced payment of taxes. Later, he included religious freedom as part of his agenda, and directed the celebration of the ancient rites of the babaylan (ancient Visayan shaman), a revival of the religious leader of the pre-Spanish era. Elofre reputedly dressed in female clothing and was said to be effeminate in the same manner as ancient asog shamans.

Death
On August 22, 1887, Elofre raided Siaton, the town adjoining Zamboanguita, and was killed in the encounter with colonial forces. His wife, Flaviana Tubigan, continued the revolt, but lacked her husband's charm and charisma. She was succeeded by Ka Martin de la Cruz, of Tolong in southern Negros Oriental, Elofre's lieutenant, but his command of the  degenerated into banditry. When the Spanish authorities failed in their bid to capture him, on September 11, 1893, de la Cruz was killed in a trap laid by his own mistress, Alfonsa Alaidan.

See also
Babaylan
Negros Oriental
Negros Revolution
Papa Isio
Philippine Revolution
Pulahan

Notes and references

People of the Philippine Revolution
Filipino revolutionaries
Paramilitary Filipinos
People from Negros Oriental
1887 deaths
Year of birth missing
Visayan people